The Birekte (Bilekte) is a river in Yakutia (Sakha Republic), Russia.

The river flows north of the Arctic Circle, across a lonely, desolate area devoid of settlements.

Course  
The Birekte is a left tributary of the Olenyok. Its sources are in the northern fringes of the Central Siberian Plateau. It heads first southwards and, after the confluence of the Omonos, it flows roughly northeastwards.

The river is fed by rain and snow. It is frozen between early October and late May.

Birekte Terrane
The Birekte terrane is located by the Anabar Shield, in the north-eastern part of the Siberian Craton, in the basins of the Popigay, Anabar, Birekte and Olenyok rivers. It is defined entirely from geophysical data and is overlain by Riphean-Paleozoic platformal cover.

See also
List of rivers of Russia

References

External links 
Schematic map of ancient terrains and kimberlitic fields in the Siberian craton
Fishing & Tourism in Yakutia

Rivers of the Sakha Republic
Tributaries of the Olenyok